Sarath Ratanavadi  is a Thai engineer and businessman. He made his fortune as founder and CEO of Thailand's third-largest energy firm, Gulf Energy Development. Ratanavadi has degrees from Chulalongkorn University and University of Southern California, and resides primarily in Bangkok. He also serves as the chairman of the NIST International School Foundation, the school his two sons attended.

In 2014 Ratanavadi established Gulf Electric and opened the company's first power plant in Thailand. Gulf continued to expand through its public offering in 2017 and now has invested in renewable energy and crypto.

References

Sarath Ratanavadi
Living people
Place of birth missing (living people)
Sarath Ratanavadi
USC Viterbi School of Engineering alumni
1965 births